The Politis–Kalfov Protocol was bilateral document signed at the League of Nations in Geneva in 1924 between Greece and Bulgaria and was concerning the “protection of the Bulgarian minority in Greece.” However it was not ratified by the Greek side.

History 
After the Tarlis incident in which 17 Bulgarian peasants were killed by a Greek soldier on July 27, 1924, near the Greco-Bulgarian border, tensions between the two countries increased. The Bulgarian National Assembly quickly ratified it in October. The protocol obliged Greece to treat all members of this minority according to the terms of the Treaty of Sevres. Greek side agreed to sponsor Bulgarian minority schools; to allow the presence of Exarchist priests if they obtained Greek citizenship and to open a minority affairs bureau in Thessaloniki, to administer minority rights. Meanwhile, in Greece internal reaction against the Protocol arose, because public opinion stood against the recognition of any “Bulgarian” minority in Northern Greece. Belgrade also was suspicious of Greece's recognition of a Bulgarian minority and was annoyed this would hinder its policy of forced “Serbianisation” in Serbian Macedonia. On February 2, 1925, the Greek Parliament, claiming pressure from the Kingdom of Yugoslavia, which threatened to renounce the Greek–Serbian Alliance of 1913, refused to ratify the agreement. On 29 May 1925 the Greek government maintained that Greece was open to any suggestions concerning the “Slavic-speaking linguistic minority” but that the existence of an ethno-religious, i.e. Bulgarian Exarchist minority was completely unacceptable.

See also
 Albanian-Bulgarian Protocol (1932)
 Incident at Petrich

References

Bulgaria–Greece relations
1924 in Greece
1924 in Bulgaria
1924 in international relations
Ethnic groups in Greece
Treaties of the Second Hellenic Republic
Treaties of the Kingdom of Bulgaria
Unratified treaties